Philippsbourg (Lorraine Franconian: Phillipsburch) is a commune in the department of Moselle,  administrative region of Grand Est, northeastern France.

The village belongs to the Pays de Bitche and to the Northern Vosges Regional Nature Park.

Sites and monuments 
 Château du Falkenstein, 12th-century ruined castle, built for surveillance of the Zinsel valley
 Château de Rothenbourg, castle ruins dating from the 9th century
 Château de Helfenstein, ruins of a castle already destroyed in 1437

See also 
 Communes of the Moselle department

References

External links 
 

Communes of Moselle (department)